The American Music Awards (AMAs) is an annual American music awards show, generally held in the fall, created by Dick Clark in 1973 for ABC when the network's contract to air the Grammy Awards expired, and currently produced by Dick Clark Productions. From 1973 to 2005, both the winners and the nominations were selected by members of the music industry, based on commercial performance, such as sales and airplay. Since 2006, winners have been determined by a poll of the public and fans, who can vote through the AMAs website.

History and overview

Conception
The AMAs was created by Dick Clark in 1973 to compete with the Grammy Awards after the move of that year's show to Nashville, Tennessee led to CBS (which has broadcast all Grammy Award shows since then) picking up the Grammy telecasts after its first two in 1971 and 1972 were broadcast on ABC. In 2014, American network Telemundo acquired the rights to produce a Spanish-language version of the American Music Awards and launched the Latin American Music Awards in 2015.

From 1973 to 2005, both the winners and the nominations were selected by members of the music industry, based on commercial performance, such as sales and airplay. Since 2006, winners have been determined by a poll of the public and fans, who can vote through the AMAs website, while nominations have remained based on sales, airplay, now including activity on social networks, and video viewing. Before 2010, had nominations based only on sales and airplay and nominated every work, even if old. The Grammys have nominations based on vote of the Academy and only nominate a work from their eligibility period that changes often.

The award statuette is manufactured by New York firm Society Awards.

Hosts
The first hosts for the first telecast of the AMAs were Helen Reddy, Roger Miller, and Smokey Robinson. Helen Reddy not only hosted the show but also became the first female artist to win an AMA for Favorite Pop/Rock Female artist. For the first decade or so, the AMAs had multiple hosts, each representing a genre of music. For instance, Glen Campbell would host the country portion (Campbell, in fact, has co-hosted the AMAs more times than any other host or co-host), while other artists would co-host to represent their genre. In recent years, however, there has been one single host.

In 1991, Keenen Ivory Wayans became the first Hollywood actor to host the AMAs.

From its inception in 1973 through 2002, the AMAs were held in mid- to late-January, but were moved to November (usually the Sunday before Thanksgiving) beginning in 2003 so as not to further compete with other major awards shows (such as the Golden Globe Awards and the Academy Awards) and allows for ABC to have a well-rated awards show during November sweeps.

For the 2008 awards, Jimmy Kimmel hosted for the fourth consecutive year. In 2009–2012, there was no host for the first time in history. Instead, the AMAs followed the Grammys' lead in having various celebrities give introductions. However, rapper Pitbull hosted the 2013 ceremony and 2014 ceremony. Jennifer Lopez hosted the 2015 show. Gigi Hadid and Jay Pharoah hosted the 2016 show. Tracee Ellis Ross hosted the show in 2017 and 2018. Ciara hosted the 2019 show.

Between 2012 and 2014, as part of a marketing strategy for Samsung, the American Music Awards used the lock screen wallpaper of Samsung Galaxy smartphones rather than envelopes to reveal winners. A magnetic screen cover on each phone kept the wallpaper image with the winner's name secret until opened.

In August 2018, Dick Clark Productions announced a two-year sponsorship and content partnership with YouTube Music.

Ceremonies

Categories

Current award categories

 Artist of the Year

 New Artist of the Year

 Collaboration of the Year

 Favorite Music Video

 Favorite Touring Artist

 Favorite Pop Male Artist

 Favorite Pop Female Artist

 Favorite Pop Duo or Group

 Favorite Pop Album

 Favorite Pop Song

 Favorite R&B Male Artist

 Favorite R&B Female Artist

 Favorite R&B Album

 Favorite R&B Song

 Favorite Country Male Artist

 Favorite Country Female Artist

 Favorite Country Duo or Group

 Favorite Country Album

 Favorite Country Song

 Favorite Hip-Hop Artist

 Favorite Hip-Hop Album

 Favorite Hip-Hop Song

 Favorite Latin Artist

 Favorite Latin Duo or Group 

 Favorite Latin Album

 Favorite Latin Song

 Favorite Rock Artist

 Favorite Rock Song

 Favorite Rock Album 

 Favorite Inspirational Artist

 Favorite Gospel Artist

 Favorite Dance/Electronic Artist

 Favorite Afrobeats Artist

 Favorite K-Pop Artist

 Favorite Soundtrack

Discontinued awards 

 Single of the Year (2013–2015)

 Fan's Choice Award (2003)

 Favorite Social Artist (2018–2020)

 Favorite Trending Song (2021)

 Favorite Pop/Rock Video (1984–1988)

 Favorite Pop/Rock Male Video Artist (1985–1987)

 Favorite Pop/Rock Female Video Artist (1985–1987)

 Favorite Pop/Rock Band/Duo/Group Video Artist (1985–1987)

 Favorite Pop/Rock New Artist (1989–Jan 2003)

 Favorite Soul/R&B Band/Duo/Group (1974–Nov 2003, 2005–2006, 2009)

 Favorite Soul/R&B Video (1984–1988)

 Favorite Soul/R&B Male Video Artist (1985–1987)

 Favorite Soul/R&B Female Video Artist (1985–1987)

 Favorite Soul/R&B Band/Duo/Group Video Artist (1985–1987)

 Favorite Soul/R&B New Artist (1989–Jan 2003)

 Favorite Country Video (1984–1988)

 Favorite Country Male Video Artist (1985–1987)

 Favorite Country Female Video Artist (1985–1987)

 Favorite Country Band/Duo/Group Video Artist (1985–1987)

 Favorite Country New Artist (1989–Jan 2003)

 Favorite Rap/Hip-Hop Band/Duo/Group (2003–2008)

 Favorite Rap/Hip-Hop New Artist (1990–1994)

 Favorite Disco Male Artist (1979)

 Favorite Disco Female Artist (1979)

 Favorite Disco Band/Duo/Group (1979)

 Favorite Disco Album (1979)

 Favorite Disco Song (1979)

 Favorite Heavy Metal/Hard Rock Artist (1989–1997)

 Favorite Heavy Metal/Hard Rock Album (1989–1992)

 Favorite Heavy Metal/Hard Rock New Artist (1990–1993)

 Favorite Dance Artist (1990–1992)

 Favorite Dance Song (1990–1992)

 Favorite Dance New Artist (1990–1992)

 Favorite Adult Contemporary Artist (1992–2020)

 Favorite Adult Contemporary Album (1992–1994)

 Favorite Adult Contemporary New Artist (1992–1994)

Most wins
The record for most American Music Awards won is held by Taylor Swift with 40 awards. The record for most American Music Awards won by a male artist belongs to Michael Jackson, who has collected 26 awards. The record for most American Music Awards won by a group belongs to Alabama, who have collected 18 awards.

Most wins in a single ceremony
The record for the most American Music Awards won in a single year is held by Michael Jackson (in 1984) and Whitney Houston (in 1994), each with 8 awards to their credit (including the Award of Merit, with which both artists were honored in the respective years).

 Michael Jackson 8 (1984)
 Whitney Houston 8 (1994)

Most wins by category
The following list shows the artists with most wins in each category, adapted from the AMAs official website.
 Artist of the Year: Taylor Swift (7 wins)
 Collaboration of the Year: Justin Bieber (3 wins)
 Song of the Year: Kenny Rogers (5 wins)
 Favourite Music Video: Taylor Swift (3 wins)
 Favorite Male Artist – Pop/Rock: Justin Bieber (4 wins)
 Favorite Female Artist – Pop/Rock: Taylor Swift (6 wins)
 Favorite Duo or Group – Pop/Rock: BTS (4 wins)
 Favorite Album – Pop/Rock: Taylor Swift (4 wins)
 Favorite Male Artist – Country: Garth Brooks (8 wins)
 Favorite Female Artist – Country: Reba McEntire (10 wins)
 Favorite Duo or Group – Country: Alabama (13 wins)
 Favorite Album – Country: Carrie Underwood (6 wins)
 Favorite Artist – Rap/Hip-Hop: Nicki Minaj (5 wins)
 Favorite Song – Rap/Hip-Hop: Cardi B (3 wins)
 Favorite Album – Rap/Hip-Hop: Nicki Minaj (3 wins)
 Favorite Male Artist – Soul/R&B: Luther Vandross (7 wins)
 Favorite Female Artist – Soul/R&B: Beyoncé, Rihanna (7 wins each)
 Favorite Album – Soul/R&B: Michael Jackson (4 wins)
 Favorite Artist – Alternative Rock: Linkin Park (6 wins)
 Favorite Artist – Adult Contemporary: Celine Dion (4 wins)
 Favorite Artist – Latin Music: Enrique Iglesias (7 wins)
 Favorite Artist – Contemporary Inspirational: Casting Crowns (4 wins)
 Favorite Artist – Electronic Dance Music: Marshmello (3 wins)

Special awards

Award of Merit

The American Music Award of Merit has been awarded to thirty two artists, the latest being Sting (2016).

International Artist Award of Excellence
The International Artist Award of Excellence is described as "an award which recognizes artists whose popularity and impact cross national boundaries and is only given when there is a deserving recipient who is worthy of recognition for their accomplishments" and has been awarded to seven artists:

 Michael Jackson (1993)
 Rod Stewart (1994)
 Led Zeppelin (1995)
 Bee Gees (1997)
 Aerosmith (2001)
 Beyoncé (2007)
 Whitney Houston (2009)

Icon Award
The AMAs' producer Larry Klein stated: "The first-ever Icon Award was created to honor an artist whose body of work has made a profound influence over pop music on a global level."

 Rihanna (2013)
 Lionel Richie (2022)

Dick Clark Award for Excellence
At the 2014 award ceremony, the Dick Clark Award for Excellence was given for the first time. It was created to recognize "an artist who achieves a groundbreaking feat or creates a landmark work.  It is to be bestowed upon someone whose spirit and excellence capture the visionary passion that Dick Clark himself incorporated into everything he did."

 Taylor Swift (2014)

Award of Achievement 

 Michael Jackson (1989)
 Prince (1990)
 Mariah Carey (2000 and 2008)
 Katy Perry (2011)

Lifetime Achievement Award
 Diana Ross (2017)

Artist of the Decade
1990s: Garth Brooks (2000)

 2010s: Taylor Swift (2019)

In 2000, the year Brooks won the award, the AMAs held a poll to elect the Artist of the Decade for each previous decade of the Rock & Roll era. According to some sources, the result of this poll is not counted in the total of AMAs won by these artists. The results were Elvis Presley (1950s), The Beatles (1960s), Stevie Wonder (1970s), and Michael Jackson (1980s).
Poll
1950s: Elvis Presley
1960s: The Beatles
1970s: Stevie Wonder
1980s: Michael Jackson

Artist of the Century
Michael Jackson won the Artist of the Century award in the 29th American Music Awards held on January 9, 2002.

Ratings

See also
Latin American Music Awards

Notes

References

External links
 

 
American Broadcasting Company original programming
Television series by Dick Clark Productions
Awards established in 1974
1974 establishments in the United States